Bischoff is a surname. Notable people with the surname include:

 Amaury Bischoff, French-Portuguese footballer
 Anna Catharina Bischoff (1719–1787), wife of pastor Lucas Gernler
 Bernard J. Bischoff (1931–1980), American politician and judge
 Bernhard Bischoff (1906–1991), German historian and paleographer
 Bob Bischoff, American politician
 Cinder & Jeffrey Bischoff
 David Bischoff (1951–2018), American science fiction and television writer
 Eduard Hagenbach-Bischoff (1833–1910), Swiss physicist and electoral reformer
 Elmer Bischoff (1916–1991), American artist
 Eric Bischoff, American wrestling announcer, WWE Raw GM, president of World Championship Wrestling
 Franz Bischoff (1864–1929), American artist
 Garett Bischoff, American wrestler, son of Eric
 Hans Bischoff (1889–1960), German entomologist
 Hermann Bischoff (1868–1936), German composer
 John Bischoff (baseball), baseball player
 John Bischoff (musician), computer musician
 John W. Bischoff (1850–1909), American blind musician and composer
 Karl Bischoff (1897–1950), German architect, engineer and Nazi functionary, chief of construction of Auschwitz II-Birkenau camp
 Klaus Bischoff (born 1960), German chess player
 Klaus Zyciora (born Klaus Bischoff; 1961), German automotive designer
 Manfred Bischoff (born 1942), German businessman
 Mikkel Bischoff, footballer
 Sabine Bischoff (1958–2013), German fencer
 Samuel Bischoff (1890–1975), American film producer
 Suzanne Bischoff van Heemskerck (born 1950), Dutch politician
 Theodor Ludwig Wilhelm von Bischoff (1807–1882), German biologist
 Winfried Bischoff, Anglo-German banker, financier, chairman of Citigroup

See also
 Mount Bischoff, Tasmania, Australia
 Hagenbach-Bischoff system and Hagenbach-Bischoff quota, terms describing a form of allocating seats in proportional representation, named after Eduard Hagenbach-Bischoff
 Bischof
 Bishoff
 Bishop (surname)

References 

German-language surnames
Swiss-language surnames
Swiss-German surnames